Superstar K2 is a South Korean television show on Mnet. Superstar K2 is season two of the Superstar competition series in which singers audition to get on the show. Each week, the singers perform a song and are eliminated based on the three judges' perception and audience voting. The winner of Superstar K2 received 200 million won ($172,282 USD) and a Samsung QM5 car.

This program began on July 23, 2010 and ended October 22, 2010 with the announcement of Huh Gak as the winner and Korean-American John Park as the runner-up.

Format
The auditions took place in 8 cities across South Korea (Daejeon, Incheon, Daegu, Gwangju, Chuncheon, Jeju Island, Busan, Seoul) and Los Angeles. There were about 1 million and 350 thousand people that participated in this show and 151 were chosen. The 151 contestants were to participate in a 3-day competition called Superweek. The competition consists of 3 missions; The Sing-Off, the Group Mission and the Rival Mission (the interview round if necessary).

The Sing-off consists of 16 people per zone. There, 4 people are chosen and choose some contestants for the Wild Card round. At the end, 50 people are selected for the next mission.

The Group Mission consists of 5 members per group. All groups have a leader and each get to choose which member they wish to have in their group. Each group is given an overnight practice for the songs they have chosen and perform for the judges the next day. There, the judges decide on which members to proceed to the next mission.  The number of people for the next mission vary from 20-24.

In this year's show, the judges decided to have an emergency wild card round to let some of the good singers who failed into the next round. They chose Kang Seung-yoon (17), Kim Greem (24), Kim He Min (24), Kim Yon-jin (25), Moon Son Young (26), Woo Eun-mi (19), John Park (23) and Hyun Seung-hee (15) to get on cars. In the end, John Park, Hyun Seung-hee, Kang Seung-yoon and Kim Greem successfully passed the round and joined the rest of the Top 24. The other four were taken to Seoul Station.

The Rival Mission consists of two rivals per pair. The pairs are organised by two people having the similar vocal skills. Like the group mission, the rivals are given an overnight practice and perform the next day. There is only one winner per pair and there are no cases of both members going through.

However this year, the Rival Mission took a shocking turn and became messed up as some pairs had both members eliminated due to their lacking effort. Only 7 members were chosen (Kim Ji-soo (21), Park Bo-ram (17), Kang Seung-yoon (17), Kim Greem (24), Lee Bo-ram (19), Kim Eun-bi (18) and John Park (23).  The judges once again held a wild card round and selected Andrew Nelson (15), Hyun Seung-hee (15), Jang Jae-in (20), Kim So-jung (22), Huh Gak (26) and Kim Bo-kyung (21).

With 13 people, the judges held an interview round where the contestants are interviewed through various questions and decide whether to eliminate the contestant or let them proceed into the Top 10. In the end, Kim Bo-kyung and Hyun Seung-hee were eliminated.

During Top 11, contestants participated in many missions throughout live shows and get special awards. The total scores of the contestants add up by

 10%-Internet votes
 30%-Judges scores
 60%-Mobile text votes

If somehow the performer got the highest total score, they will be automatically Super Saved and proceed to the next round.

Huh Gak won the show against John Park 988:596 and won 200 million won and a QM5.

Top 11

Group Mission (Top 50)
No.1- Gummy: Kid

No.2- Park Bom: You and I

No.3- Wonder Girls: 2 Different Tears

No.4- Park Mi Kyung: Meaningless Reason

No.5- JYP: Honey

No.6- Brown Eyes: Already a Year

No.7- Kim Tae Woo: Love Rain

No.8- 2AM: Can't let you go, even if i die

No.9- Davichi: 8282

No.10- CNBLUE: Love

Last Consolation (Wild Card)

Rival Mission (Top 24)

 Winner of each group advanced to the next round. Both of the competitors were eliminated in some of the pairs.
 Wild cards were interviewed by the judges once again, and some of them were selected to advance to the next round.

Live shows
Bold=Super Save (highest judges score before Top 4, directly advanced to the next round regardless of the public vote)
Italics=Eliminated
Normal=Safe

Episode 9
Weekly Mission: Visual/Health/Vocal Mission

Winner: Male Team (John Park, Kim Ji-su, Andrew Nelson, Kang Seung-yoon, Huh Gak)

Reward: Shopping Spree

Performance- Remake hits (1960–2010)

Episode 10
Weekly Mission: Musical

Winner: Andrew Nelson

Reward: House Captain, Performance Order

Performance: Lee Moon Sae Special

Episode 11
Weekly Mission: Composing Mission

Winner: Kang Seung-yoon, Jang Jae-in, Huh Gak

Reward: Call to love one, Free Time

Performance: Michael Jackson Special

Episode 12
Weekly Mission: Worldstar Performance Mission

Winner: Huh Gak

Reward: Headphones, Performance Order

Performance: Judges Hit Remake

Episode 13
Weekly Mission: Candid Camera Mission

Winner: Huh Gak

Reward: Digital Camera, Performance Order

Performance: Audiences' Song Choice

Episode 14
Weekly Mission: Commercial Mission

Winner: John Park

Reward: 100 boxes of Coca-Cola, 3D Laptop, Performance Order

Performance: Free Performance & Title Song Performance

References

External links
 Official website

2010 South Korean television seasons